WPAM (1450 AM) was a radio station licensed to Pottsville, Pennsylvania, United States. Studios and transmitter atop Lawton's Hill. Established in 1946, the station was owned by Curran Communications.

On May 17, 2017, the Federal Communications Commission informed WPAM that, as the station had been silent since at least July 23, 2015, it was in the process of cancelling the station's license; the license was canceled on June 29, 2017.

References

External links
FCC Station Search Details: DWPAM (Facility ID: 14741)
 (covering 1945-1981)

PAM
Defunct radio stations in the United States
Radio stations established in 1946
1946 establishments in Pennsylvania
Radio stations disestablished in 2015
2015 disestablishments in Pennsylvania
PAM